Kielmeyera peruviana is a species of flowering plant in the Calophyllaceae family. It is found only in Peru.

References

peruviana
Endemic flora of Peru
Trees of Peru
Vulnerable flora of South America
Taxonomy articles created by Polbot